The Game Master is a handheld game console manufactured by Hartung, and designed to compete with the Nintendo Game Boy. In Germany, it was marketed by Hartung itself, while in the UK it was released as the Systema 2000 by the already well-established maker of cheap LCD games Systema. It was also sold a few under alternate names in France, including the Videojet Game Master as well as for a few released by Hartung as the Hartung Super Game and the Hartung Game Tronic. The Game Master has a 64 x 64 monochrome LCD screen.

The design was much like the Game Gear with a D-Pad and two action buttons, although another variation, the Game Plus, features a more Game Boy-like design which is backed by a company called Caterpillar and was sold by Delplay in France. The cartridges resemble those used by the Watara Supervision, with the card edge of the cartridge jutted out past the plastic of the cartridge. The Game Master utilizes a 40-pin cartridge port like the Supervision but is not compatible with Supervision games.

Models
Hartung Game Master (Germany)
Systema 2000 (the United Kingdom)
Videojet Game Master (France)
Hartung Game Tronic (France)
Hartung Mega Tronic (France)
Hartung Super Game (France)
Prodis PDJ-10 (Spain)
Delplay Game Plus (France; incompatible with all Game Master cartridges)
Impel Game Master (Hong Kong)
Watara Game Master (Hong Kong)

Technical specifications
 Color: monochrome black/white tones
 Power switch
 Contrast adjustment
 4-way directional pad
 Headphone jack (unit includes small stereo headphones)
 A and B buttons
 Select button
 Start button
 Volume controller

Games

 Bubble Boy
 Car Racing [a.k.a. Super F-1 on title screen]
 Continental Galaxy [a.k.a. Continental Galaxy 2020 on title screen]
 Dungeon Advanture [a.k.a. Dungeon Adventure on title screen]
 Falling Block [a.k.a. Falling Block! on title screen]
 Finite Zone
 Go Bang! (Go Bang Game) [a.k.a. GO Bang.. on title screen]
 Hyper Space
 Kung Fu [a.k.a. Kung Fu Challenge on title screen]
 Move It
 Pin Ball
 Soccer (Fuss-Ball) [a.k.a. 3on3 Soccer on title screen]
 Space Castle
 Space Invader
 Space Warrior
 Tank War
 Tennis [a.k.a. Tennis Master... on title screen]
 Urban Champion

References

External links
 Overview at a game console database
 
 Multi-system emulator that supports Hartung Game Master

Computer-related introductions in 1990
Fourth-generation video game consoles
Monochrome video game consoles